The Savi[i] agli Ordini or Savi ai Ordini were senior magistrates of the Republic of Venice, charged with supervision of maritime matters, including commerce, the Venetian navy and the Republic's oversees colonies.

History
The five  were the earliest board of experts ('sages') to be established to help the leadership of the Venetian Republic—the Signoria of Venice—prepare legislation for submission to the Venetian Senate, the Council of the Forty, or the Great Council. As such, along with the other boards of  established in the 14th/15th centuries, they sat on the Full College, the Republic's effective cabinet. In 1442, they were aggregated to the Senate, becoming ex officio members of it.

They were originally elected every November for a term of a month, simply to formulate commercial policy—on the size and destination of the trade convoys that sailed each spring—and naval policy—the outfitting of the 'guard fleet', intended for operations in the Adriatic Sea, the Aegean Sea, and the Eastern Mediterranean. By  the  had become a fixture of the government, and their terms of office were extended to cover an entire year.  

In the 15th century, as with other higher magistracies of Venice, restrictions were placed on the eligibility to the office: the members were elected by the Senate, served a term of six months, beginning on 1 April or 1 October, and could not be re-elected to the same office for six months thereafter. 

Their significance declined considerably after the end of the disastrous Second Ottoman–Venetian War in 1503. As the 16th-century political thinker Donato Giannotti put it, "their office is to be silent and listen".

Like all , the office did not carry a salary, but could be held in tandem with other public offices.

References

Sources
 
 
 
 
 
 

Stato da Màr
Government of the Republic of Venice
Venetian navy